Jelena Mrdjenovich (born 24 June 1982) is a Canadian professional boxer. She has held multiple world championships in three weight classes, including the WBC female super featherweight title from 2005 to 2009; the WIBF lightweight title from 2006 to 2008; the WIBA featherweight title from 2011 to 2012; the WBC female featherweight title three times between 2012 and February 2021; and the WBA female featherweight title from 2016 to April 2021; As of September 2020, she is ranked as the world's second best active female by The Ring and fourth by BoxRec.

In March 2017, a documentary was released about her career.

In February 2021 WBC announced that it had awarded Mrdjenovich the title of featherweight Emeritus Champion.

Professional boxing record

References

External links
 

1982 births
Sportspeople from the Northwest Territories
Living people
Canadian women boxers
World boxing champions
Canadian people of Serbian descent
People from Hay River
Featherweight boxers